Brisinga endecacnemos is a species of starfish found in deep waters off Norway, Rockall Trough off Ireland, Cape Verde, to the Mid-Atlantic Ridge. The species is described as being a "brilliant red", with a body measuring between 2.8 cm and 3.0 cm and 9 to 12 limbs generally measuring over 33 cm. Upon its discovery it was deemed to be an evolutionary link between ophiuroids and asteroids.

References

Brisingida
Fauna of the Atlantic Ocean
Animals described in 1856